Maximiliano Gauna (born ) is an Argentine volleyball player. He is part of the Argentina men's national volleyball team. At club level he plays for Friedrichshafen Club.

References

External links
 profile at FIVB.org

1989 births
Living people
Argentine men's volleyball players
Place of birth missing (living people)
Pan American Games gold medalists for Argentina
Pan American Games bronze medalists for Argentina
Pan American Games medalists in volleyball
Volleyball players at the 2011 Pan American Games
Volleyball players at the 2015 Pan American Games
Medalists at the 2011 Pan American Games
Medalists at the 2015 Pan American Games
21st-century Argentine people